Ozinga Field is a baseball field located in Crestwood, Illinois. The stadium was built in 1999 and holds 3,200 people. It is the home field of the 2007 and 2008 Frontier League champions, the Windy City ThunderBolts.

Name
The park features one of the few minor league baseball stadium upper decks in the country. The park was built for the Cook County Cheetahs. However, new ownership changed the name of the team into the current Windy City ThunderBolts.

Renovations
The name change brought renovations to the ballpark between 2004 and 2006 including a new fan deck on the first base side, a beer garden, a new kids zone down the left field line, and a new ticket office also down the left field line. The ballpark was originally called Hawkinson Ford Field until the 2007 season when the park's name was modified to Hawk Ford Field. Another name change occurred during the 2007 season on August 13, when the naming rights were sold to Standard Bank.  A new scoreboard/videoboard system was added toward the end of the 2014 season and in 2015 the old grass playing surface was removed and a new synthetic turf field with new drainage system was installed.  The renovations make the facility a multi-sport & concert arena available 10 months a year.

On February 20, 2019, the ThunderBolts and the village of Crestwood issued a statement announcing the name change to Ozinga Field.

References

External links 
 Standard Bank Stadium on Facebook
 Windy City Thunderbolts

Minor league baseball venues
Baseball venues in Illinois
Frontier League ballparks
1999 establishments in Illinois
Sports venues completed in 1999